The RBR-120 mm M90 (nicknamed "Стршљен" or "Stršljen", meaning "Hornet") is a light-weight, single-use, unguided anti-tank rocket launcher. The launcher is produced by Eurokompozit of Prilep, North Macedonia and Poliester of Priboj, Serbia, while the anti-tank rocket is produced by Sloboda of Čačak, Serbia. It is intended for use against tanks and other armoured vehicles in addition to fortifications and infantry.

On impact, a piezoelectric impact fuse in the rocket triggers the shaped charge warhead, which can penetrate an equivalent of over 800 millimeters of RHA.

Design
The M90 consists of a disposable rocket launcher and a HEAT projectile, which is propelled by an impulse-type sustainer.

Users

References

External links 
 M90 website from Eurokompozit

Anti-tank rockets
Military Technical Institute Belgrade
Military equipment introduced in the 2000s